Kiama, an electoral district of the Legislative Assembly in the Australian state of New South Wales, had two incarnations, the first from 1859 to 1904, the second from 1981 until the present.


Members

Election results

Elections in the 2010s

2019

2015

2011

Elections in the 2000s

2007

2003

Elections in the 1990s

1999

1995

1991

Elections in the 1980s

1988

1986 by-election

1984

1981

1904-1991

1901
This section is an excerpt from 1901 New South Wales state election § Kiama

Elections in the 1890s

1898
This section is an excerpt from 1898 New South Wales colonial election § Kiama

1895
This section is an excerpt from 1895 New South Wales colonial election § Kiama

1894
This section is an excerpt from 1894 New South Wales colonial election § Kiama

1891
This section is an excerpt from 1891 New South Wales colonial election § Kiama

Elections in the 1880s

1889
This section is an excerpt from 1889 New South Wales colonial election § Kiama

1887
This section is an excerpt from 1887 New South Wales colonial election § Kiama

1887 by-election

1885
This section is an excerpt from 1885 New South Wales colonial election § Kiama

1882
This section is an excerpt from 1882 New South Wales colonial election § Kiama

1880
This section is an excerpt from 1880 New South Wales colonial election § Kiama

1880 by-election

1871 by-election

1870 by-election

Elections in the 1870s

1877

1874
This section is an excerpt from 1874-75 New South Wales colonial election § Kiama

1872
This section is an excerpt from 1872 New South Wales colonial election § Kiama

Elections in the 1860s

1869
This section is an excerpt from 1869-70 New South Wales colonial election § Kiama

1864
This section is an excerpt from 1864–65 New South Wales colonial election § Kiama

1864 by-election

1860
This section is an excerpt from 1860 New South Wales colonial election § Kiama

Elections in the 1850s

1859
This section is an excerpt from 1859 New South Wales colonial election § Kiama

References

New South Wales state electoral results by district